The following is a partial list of the "D" codes for Medical Subject Headings (MeSH), as defined by the United States National Library of Medicine (NLM).

This list continues the information at List of MeSH codes (D26). Codes following these are found at List of MeSH codes (E01). For other MeSH codes, see List of MeSH codes.

The source for this content is the set of 2006 MeSH Trees from the NLM.

– chemical actions and uses

– pharmacologic actions

– molecular mechanisms of action
  – alkylating agents
  – antineoplastic agents, alkylating
  – angiotensin ii type 1 receptor blockers
  – antacids
  – antimetabolites
  – antilipemic agents
  – anticholesteremic agents
  – hydroxymethylglutaryl-coa reductase inhibitors
  – lipotropic agents
  – antimetabolites, antineoplastic
  – antioxidants
  – free radical scavengers
  – chelating agents
  – iron chelating agents
  – siderophores
  – enzyme activators
  – gtp phosphohydrolase activators
  – enzyme inhibitors
  – aromatase inhibitors
  – carbonic anhydrase inhibitors
  – cholinesterase inhibitors
  – cyclooxygenase inhibitors
  – cyclooxygenase 2 inhibitors
  – folic acid antagonists
  – hydroxymethylglutaryl-coa reductase inhibitors
  – integrase inhibitors
  – hiv integrase inhibitors
  – lipoxygenase inhibitors
  – monoamine oxidase inhibitors
  – nucleic acid synthesis inhibitors
  – reverse-transcriptase inhibitors
  – phosphodiesterase inhibitors
  – protease inhibitors
  – angiotensin-converting enzyme inhibitors
  – cysteine proteinase inhibitors
  – hiv protease inhibitors
  – serine proteinase inhibitors
  – trypsin inhibitors
  – protein kinase inhibitors
  – protein synthesis inhibitors
  – uncoupling agents
  – enzyme reactivators
  – cholinesterase reactivators
  – fibrin modulating agents
  – antifibrinolytic agents
  – fibrinolytic agents
  – heparin antagonists
  – hiv fusion inhibitors
  – membrane transport modulators
  – calcium channel agonists
  – calcium channel blockers
  – ionophores
  – potassium channel blockers
  – sodium channel blockers
  – sodium chloride symporter inhibitors
  – sodium potassium chloride symporter inhibitors
  – mitosis modulators
  – antimitotic agents
  – tubulin modulators
  – mitogens
  – neurotransmitter agents
  – adrenergic agents
  – adrenergic agonists
  – adrenergic alpha-agonists
  – adrenergic beta-agonists
  – adrenergic antagonists
  – adrenergic alpha-antagonists
  – adrenergic beta-antagonists
  – adrenergic uptake inhibitors
  – cholinergic agents
  – cholinergic agonists
  – muscarinic agonists
  – nicotinic agonists
  – cholinergic antagonists
  – muscarinic antagonists
  – nicotinic antagonists
  – cholinesterase inhibitors
  – cholinesterase reactivators
  – dopamine agents
  – dopamine agonists
  – dopamine antagonists
  – dopamine uptake inhibitors
  – endocannabinoids
  – excitatory amino acid agents
  – excitatory amino acid agonists
  – excitatory amino acid antagonists
  – GABA agents
  – GABA agonists
  – GABA antagonists
  – GABA modulators
  – glycine agents
  – histamine agents
  – histamine agonists
  – histamine antagonists
  – histamine h1 antagonists
  – histamine h1 antagonists, non-sedating
  – histamine h2 antagonists
  – neurotransmitter uptake inhibitors
  – adrenergic uptake inhibitors
  – dopamine uptake inhibitors
  – serotonin uptake inhibitors
  – serotonin agents
  – serotonin agonists
  – serotonin antagonists
  – serotonin uptake inhibitors
  – nitric oxide donors

– physiological effects of drugs
  – antispermatogenic agents
  – sperm immobilizing agents
  – spermatocidal agents
  – spermatogenesis-blocking agents
  – astringents
  – bone density conservation agents
  – central nervous system depressants
  – anesthetics
  – anesthetics, combined
  – anesthetics, general
  – anesthetics, inhalation
  – anesthetics, intravenous
  – anesthetics, dissociative
  – anesthetics, local
  – hypnotics and sedatives
  – narcotics
  – tranquilizing agents
  – anti-anxiety agents
  – antimanic agents
  – antipsychotic agents
  – central nervous system stimulants
  – aphrodisiacs
  – appetite stimulants
  – convulsants
  – emetics
  – endocrine disruptors
  – growth substances
  – angiogenesis modulating agents
  – angiogenesis inducing agents
  – angiogenesis inhibitors
  – growth inhibitors
  – angiogenesis inhibitors
  – micronutrients
  – trace elements
  – vitamins
  – vitamin b complex
  – plant growth regulators
  – hallucinogens
  – hormones, hormone substitutes, and hormone antagonists
  – hormone antagonists
  – aldosterone antagonists
  – androgen antagonists
  – antithyroid agents
  – estrogen receptor modulators
  – estrogen antagonists
  – estradiol antagonists
  – selective estrogen receptor modulators
  – insulin antagonists
  – leukotriene antagonists
  – prostaglandin antagonists
  – hormones
  – anabolic agents
  – androgens
  – endocannabinoids
  – estrogens
  – estrogens, non-steroidal
  – phytoestrogens
  – glucocorticoids
  – mineralocorticoids
  – progestins
  – hypnotics and sedatives
  – hypoglycemic agents
  – immunologic factors
  – agglutinins
  – hemagglutinins
  – biological response modifiers
  – adjuvants, immunologic
  – interferon inducers
  – immunosuppressive agents
  – complement inactivating agents
  – myeloablative agonists
  – muscle relaxants, central
  – narcotic antagonists
  – natriuretic agents
  – antidiuretic agents
  – diuretics
  – diuretics, osmotic
  – neurotransmitter agents
  – adrenergic agents
  – adrenergic agonists
  – adrenergic alpha-agonists
  – adrenergic beta-agonists
  – adrenergic antagonists
  – adrenergic alpha-antagonists
  – adrenergic beta-antagonists
  – adrenergic uptake inhibitors
  – cholinergic agents
  – cholinergic agonists
  – muscarinic agonists
  – nicotinic agonists
  – cholinergic antagonists
  – muscarinic antagonists
  – nicotinic antagonists
  – cholinesterase inhibitors
  – cholinesterase reactivators
  – dopamine agents
  – dopamine agonists
  – dopamine antagonists
  – dopamine uptake inhibitors
  – excitatory amino acid agents
  – excitatory amino acid agonists
  – excitatory amino acid antagonists
  – GABA agents
  – GABA agonists
  – GABA antagonists
  – GABA modulators
  – glycine agents
  – histamine agents
  – histamine agonists
  – histamine antagonists
  – histamine h1 antagonists
  – histamine h1 antagonists, non-sedating
  – histamine h2 antagonists
  – neurotransmitter uptake inhibitors
  – adrenergic uptake inhibitors
  – dopamine uptake inhibitors
  – serotonin uptake inhibitors
  – serotonin agents
  – serotonin agonists
  – serotonin antagonists
  – serotonin uptake inhibitors
  – peripheral nervous system agents
  – autonomic agents
  – antiemetics
  – bronchoconstrictor agents
  – bronchodilator agents
  – emetics
  – ganglionic blockers
  – ganglionic stimulants
  – miotics
  – mydriatics
  – parasympatholytics
  – parasympathomimetics
  – sympatholytics
  – sympathomimetics
  – neuromuscular agents
  – muscle relaxants, central
  – neuromuscular blocking agents
  – neuromuscular depolarizing agents
  – neuromuscular nondepolarizing agents
  – sensory system agents
  – analgesics
  – analgesics, non-narcotic
  – anti-inflammatory agents, non-steroidal
  – cyclooxygenase inhibitors
  – cyclooxygenase 2 inhibitors
  – anesthetics, local
  – protective agents
  – antidotes
  – antimutagenic agents
  – antioxidants
  – cariostatic agents
  – cryoprotective agents
  – neuroprotective agents
  – radiation-protective agents
  – sunscreening agents
  – radiation-sensitizing agents
  – photosensitizing agents
  – reproductive control agents
  – abortifacient agents
  – abortifacient agents, nonsteroidal
  – abortifacient agents, steroidal
  – contraceptive agents
  – contraceptive agents, female
  – contraceptives, oral
  – contraceptives, oral, combined
  – contraceptives, oral, hormonal
  – contraceptives, oral, sequential
  – contraceptives, oral, synthetic
  – contraceptives, postcoital
  – contraceptives, postcoital, hormonal
  – contraceptives, postcoital, synthetic
  – luteolytic agents
  – menstruation-inducing agents
  – sperm immobilizing agents
  – spermatocidal agents
  – contraceptive agents, male
  – antispermatogenic agents
  – spermatogenesis-blocking agents
  – fertility agents
  – fertility agents, female
  – fertility agents, male
  – luteolytic agents
  – menstruation-inducing agents
  – oxytocics
  – tocolytic agents

– therapeutic uses
  – anti-allergic agents
  – anti-infective agents
  – anti-bacterial agents
  – antibiotics, antitubercular
  – antitreponemal agents
  – antitubercular agents
  – antibiotics, antitubercular
  – leprostatic agents
  – antifungal agents
  – antibiotics, antifungal
  – anti-infective agents, local
  – anti-infective agents, urinary
  – antiparasitic agents
  – anthelmintics
  – antinematodal agents
  – filaricides
  – antiplatyhelmintic agents
  – anticestodal agents
  – schistosomicides
  – antiprotozoal agents
  – amebicides
  – antimalarials
  – antitrichomonal agents
  – coccidiostats
  – trypanocidal agents
  – antiviral agents
  – anti-retroviral agents
  – anti-hiv agents
  – hiv fusion inhibitors
  – hiv integrase inhibitors
  – hiv protease inhibitors
  – reverse-transcriptase inhibitors
  – disinfectants
  – contact lens solutions
  – dental disinfectants
  – anti-inflammatory agents
  – anti-inflammatory agents, non-steroidal
  – cyclooxygenase inhibitors
  – cyclooxygenase 2 inhibitors
  – antilipemic agents
  – anticholesteremic agents
  – hydroxymethylglutaryl-coa reductase inhibitors
  – lipotropic agents
  – antineoplastic agents
  – angiogenesis inhibitors
  – antibiotics, antineoplastic
  – anticarcinogenic agents
  – antimetabolites, antineoplastic
  – antimitotic agents
  – antineoplastic agents, alkylating
  – antineoplastic agents, hormonal
  – antineoplastic agents, phytogenic
  – myeloablative agonists
  – antirheumatic agents
  – anti-inflammatory agents, non-steroidal
  – gout suppressants
  – uricosuric agents
  – cardiovascular agents
  – anti-arrhythmia agents
  – antihypertensive agents
  – calcium channel blockers
  – cardioplegic solutions
  – cardiotonic agents
  – fibrinolytic agents
  – natriuretic agents
  – nitric oxide donors
  – potassium channel blockers
  – sclerosing solutions
  – sodium channel blockers
  – vasoconstrictor agents
  – calcium channel agonists
  – nasal decongestants
  – vasodilator agents
  – endothelium-dependent relaxing factors
  – central nervous system agents
  – adjuvants, anesthesia
  – alcohol deterrents
  – analgesics
  – analgesics, non-narcotic
  – analgesics, opioid
  – anticonvulsants
  – anti-dyskinesia agents
  – antiparkinson agents
  – antiemetics
  – anti-obesity agents
  – appetite depressants
  – antitussive agents
  – central nervous system depressants
  – anesthetics
  – anesthetics, combined
  – anesthetics, general
  – anesthetics, inhalation
  – anesthetics, intravenous
  – anesthetics, dissociative
  – anesthetics, local
  – hypnotics and sedatives
  – narcotics
  – tranquilizing agents
  – anti-anxiety agents
  – antimanic agents
  – antipsychotic agents
  – central nervous system stimulants
  – aphrodisiacs
  – appetite stimulants
  – convulsants
  – emetics
  – hallucinogens
  – hypnotics and sedatives
  – muscle relaxants, central
  – narcotic antagonists
  – neuroprotective agents
  – nootropic agents
  – psychotropic drugs
  – antidepressive agents
  – antidepressive agents, second-generation
  – antidepressive agents, tricyclic
  – hallucinogens
  – tranquilizing agents
  – anti-anxiety agents
  – antimanic agents
  – antipsychotic agents
  – dermatologic agents
  – antipruritics
  – astringents
  – emollients
  – keratolytic agents
  – photosensitizing agents
  – sunscreening agents
  – gastrointestinal agents
  – antidiarrheals
  – antiemetics
  – anti-ulcer agents
  – cathartics
  – cholagogues and choleretics
  – emetics
  – lipotropic agents
  – hematologic agents
  – anticoagulants
  – antisickling agents
  – blood substitutes
  – plasma substitutes
  – coagulants
  – hemostatics
  – antifibrinolytic agents
  – heparin antagonists
  – fibrinolytic agents
  – hematinics
  – platelet aggregation inhibitors
  – renal agents
  – anti-infective agents, urinary
  – uricosuric agents
  – reproductive control agents
  – abortifacient agents
  – abortifacient agents, nonsteroidal
  – abortifacient agents, steroidal
  – contraceptive agents
  – contraceptive agents, female
  – contraceptives, oral
  – contraceptives, oral, combined
  – contraceptives, oral, hormonal
  – contraceptives, oral, sequential
  – contraceptives, oral, synthetic
  – contraceptives, postcoital
  – contraceptives, postcoital, hormonal
  – contraceptives, postcoital, synthetic
  – luteolytic agents
  – menstruation-inducing agents
  – sperm immobilizing agents
  – spermatocidal agents
  – contraceptive agents, male
  – antispermatogenic agents
  – spermatogenesis-blocking agents
  – fertility agents
  – fertility agents, female
  – fertility agents, male
  – luteolytic agents
  – menstruation-inducing agents
  – oxytocics
  – tocolytic agents
  – respiratory system agents
  – anti-asthmatic agents
  – bronchodilator agents
  – antitussive agents
  – bronchoconstrictor agents
  – expectorants
  – nasal decongestants
  – pulmonary surfactants
  – stimulants (historical)

– specialty uses of chemicals

– adhesives

– agrochemicals
  – fertilizers

– biomedical and dental materials
  – biocompatible materials
  – bone cements
  – cariogenic agents
  – cariostatic agents
  – dental materials
  – mouthwashes
  – tissue adhesives

– caustics

– chelating agents
  – iron chelating agents

– coloring agents
  – chromogenic compounds
  – fluorescent dyes
  – food coloring agents

– contrast media

– cosmetics
  – antiperspirants
  – dentifrices
  – toothpaste
  – deodorants
  – hair preparations
  – hair dyes
  – mouthwashes
  – perfume
  – sunscreening agents

– disinfectants
  – contact lens solutions
  – dental disinfectants

– dosage forms
  – capsules
  – colloids
  – aerosols
  – aerosol propellants
  – emulsions
  – gels
  – suspensions
  – delayed-action preparations
  – drug implants
  – tablets, enteric-coated
  – drug carriers
  – liposomes
  – virosomes
  – liniments
  – ointments
  – pharmaceutical solutions
  – cardioplegic solutions
  – dialysis solutions
  – hemodialysis solutions
  – ophthalmic solutions
  – sclerosing solutions
  – powders
  – suppositories
  – tablets
  – tablets, enteric-coated
  – vaginal creams, foams and jellies

– fixatives

– flame retardants

– flavoring agents
  – sweetening agents

– food additives
  – fat substitutes
  – food coloring agents
  – food preservatives

– ionophores

– irritants
  – tear gases

– laboratory chemicals
  – buffers
  – ampholyte mixtures
  – culture media
  – culture media, conditioned
  – culture media, serum-free
  – coloring agents
  – fluorescent dyes
  – indicators and reagents
  – affinity labels
  – photoaffinity labels
  – chromogenic compounds
  – cross-linking reagents
  – intercalating agents
  – luminescent agents
  – fluorescent dyes
  – radiopharmaceuticals
  – reagent kits, diagnostic
  – reagent strips
  – reducing agents
  – sulfhydryl reagents
  – thiobarbituric acid reactive substances
  – ion exchange resins
  – anion exchange resins
  – cation exchange resins
  – ligands
  – molecular probes
  – nucleic acid probes
  – antisense elements (genetics)
  – DNA, antisense
  – oligodeoxyribonucleotides, antisense
  – oligonucleotides, antisense
  – oligodeoxyribonucleotides, antisense
  – oligoribonucleotides, antisense
  – rna, antisense
  – oligoribonucleotides, antisense
  – DNA probes
  – DNA, complementary
  – DNA primers
  – DNA probes, hla
  – DNA probes, hpv
  – oligonucleotide probes
  – rna probes
  – rna, complementary

– oxidants
  – oxidants, photochemical

– pesticides
  – chemosterilants
  – fungicides, industrial
  – herbicides
  – defoliants, chemical
  – insect repellents
  – insecticides
  – molluscacides
  – pesticide synergists
  – rodenticides

– pharmaceutic aids
  – adjuvants, pharmaceutic
  – ointment bases
  – preservatives, pharmaceutical
  – vehicles
  – excipients

– plasticizers

– poisons
  – chemical warfare agents

– protective agents
  – antidotes
  – antimutagenic agents
  – antioxidants
  – cardiotonic agents
  – cariostatic agents
  – cryoprotective agents
  – radiation-protective agents
  – sunscreening agents

– riot control agents, chemical
  – irritants
  – tear gases

– solvents

– surface-active agents
  – antifoaming agents
  – detergents
  – soaps
  – emulsifying agents
  – immunosorbents
  – iodophors
  – wetting agents

– sweetening agents

– toxic actions

– environmental pollutants
  – air pollutants
  – air pollutants, environmental
  – oxidants, photochemical
  – air pollutants, occupational
  – air pollutants, radioactive
  – endocrine disruptors
  – hazardous substances
  – industrial waste
  – soil pollutants
  – soil pollutants, radioactive
  – water pollutants
  – water pollutants, chemical
  – water pollutants, radioactive

– noxae
  – alkylating agents
  – antineoplastic agents, alkylating
  – antimetabolites
  – antimetabolites, antineoplastic
  – antispermatogenic agents
  – sperm immobilizing agents
  – spermatocidal agents
  – spermatogenesis-blocking agents
  – carcinogens
  – carcinogens, environmental
  – peroxisome proliferators
  – caustics
  – cytotoxins
  – hemolysins
  – leukocidins
  – dermotoxins
  – immunotoxins
  – irritants
  – tear gases
  – mutagens
  – aneugens
  – neurotoxins
  – oxidants
  – oxidants, photochemical
  – poisons
  – chemical warfare agents
  – pyrogens
  – riot control agents, chemical
  – irritants
  – tear gases
  – teratogens

– pesticides
  – chemosterilants
  – fungicides, industrial
  – herbicides
  – defoliants, chemical
  – insect repellents
  – insecticides
  – molluscacides
  – pesticide residues
  – pesticide synergists
  – rodenticides

The list continues at List of MeSH codes (E01).

D27